Lyle R. Sturgeon (January 18, 1914 – December 28, 1958) was a National Football League player having played in 7 games for the Green Bay Packers in 1937.

External links 
Stats at DatabaseFootball
 pro-football-reference

1914 births
1958 deaths
Green Bay Packers players
Gridiron football people from Saskatchewan
Canadian players of American football
American football offensive linemen
North Dakota State Bison football players
People from Carnduff